Sagunt railway station is the central railway station serving the municipality of Sagunt, Spain. The station is situated on the intersection of the Valencia−Sant Vicenç de Calders railway and the Zaragoza-Sagunt railway and is part of Adif and it accommodates RENFE long-distance and medium-distance trains.

Services

References 

Railway stations in the Valencian Community
Railway stations in Spain opened in 1865